Salman Yusuff Khan (born 12 June 1985) is an Indian dancer, actor, choreographer and television judge. He participated in and emerged as winner of  Dance India Dance 1. He also participated in Fear Factor: Khatron Ke Khiladi 5 and Jhalak Dikhhla Jaa 9.

Career
Khan started his career with the dance reality show Dance India Dance in its (first season). After winning the show, Khan appeared in the title song of Wanted. He then did the music video  "Dance Of Death" for the movie Rakta Charitra and in the video Alive (2011).He appeared in the film Sukoon - Vaishali Made. 

In 2013, he debuted as an actor in the 3D dance-based film ABCD: Anybody Can Dance, which was released on 8 February 2013, directed by Remo D'Souza co-starring Prabhu Deva, Dharmesh Yelande, Lauren Gottlieb and Punit Pathak.

He later participated in Jhalak Dikhhla Jaa first as a choreographer opposite Yana Gupta (Season 4), Isha Sharvani (Season 5) and became the winner with Drashti Dhami (Season 6) in 2013. In 2014, he was a participant of Fear Factor: Khatron Ke Khiladi 5. He was also choreographer in Creature 3D, Zid. Salman was a judge in the dance reality show Dance Dance Juniors.

In 2018, he starred in the Tamil dance film Lakshmi, which was released on 24 August 2018, directed by A. L. Vijay co-starring Prabhu Deva, Ditya Bhande, and Aishwarya Rajesh. Later, he is the judge of dance reality show HIGH FEVER, and he also was a Choreographer in Welcome to New York.

In 2020, he appeared in the dance film Street Dancer 3D which was released on 24 January 2020, directed by Remo D'Souza co-starring Varun Dhawan, Shraddha Kapoor, Prabhu Deva, Raghav Juyal, and Nora Fatehi.

Personal life
Salman Yusuff Khan married his longtime girlfriend, an air hostess, Faiza Haramain in 2013.

Filmography

Television

References

External links

Indian male dancers
Living people
1985 births
Male actors from Bangalore
Indian male film actors
Male actors in Hindi cinema
Participants in Indian reality television series
Fear Factor: Khatron Ke Khiladi participants